James C. Taylor (February 8, 1930 – March 18, 1999) was an American politician.

Taylor was born in Crawfordsville, Arkansas, and grew up in Chicago, Illinois. Taylor was an African-American. He went to University of Illinois and Monticello College. He served in the United States Army during the Korean War. Taylor worked in the Chicago Department of Sanitation and was a supervisor for the Stevenson Expressway. Taylor served in the Illinois Senate from 1981 to 1983. He also served in the Illinois House of Representatives from 1969 to 1981 and from 1983 to 1985 and was a Democrat. Taylor died from a heart attack at the Ingalls Hospital in Harvey, Illinois.

Notes

1930 births
1999 deaths
People from Crittenden County, Arkansas
Politicians from Chicago
Military personnel from Illinois
University of Illinois alumni
African-American state legislators in Illinois
Democratic Party members of the Illinois House of Representatives
Democratic Party Illinois state senators
20th-century American politicians
20th-century African-American politicians